John Catherwood may refer to:
 John Hugh Catherwood (1888–1930), American seaman awarded the Medal of Honor
 John Alexander Catherwood (1857–1940), farmer and politician in British Columbia, Canada

See also
Catherwood (disambiguation)